Gagingwell is a hamlet in West Oxfordshire, about  east of Chipping Norton and about  east of Enstone.  The hamlet surrounds a group of springs that give rise to a brook, which flows southwards almost  to join the River Glyme just downstream of the hamlet of Radford.

History
In the late Middle Ages a stone wayside cross was built next to one of the springs. Its surviving plinth and steps are a scheduled monument and a Grade II* listed building. Gagingwell's few houses are late 17th or 18th century stone buildings with roofs of Stonesfield Slate or, in one case, thatch. The hamlet has also two 18th or early 19th century stone-built barns. Gagingwell is on the main road between Enstone and Bicester. The road was turnpiked in 1793, disturnpiked in 1876 and is now classified as the B4030.  In 1848 Gagingwell's population was reckoned to be 57 people.

References

Hamlets in Oxfordshire
West Oxfordshire District